William A. Pearson is a New Hampshire politician.

Education
Pearson earned a B.A. in political science from Keene State College.

Career
On November 8, 2016, Pearson was again elected to the New Hampshire House of Representatives where he represented the Cheshire 4 district. Pearson assumed office on November 4, 2014 and ended his term in 2016. On November 8, 2016, Pearson was again elected to the New Hampshire House of Representatives where he represented the Cheshire 16 district. Pearson assumed office in 2016. Pearson is a Democrat.

Personal life
Pearson resides in Keene, New Hampshire.

References

Living people
People from Keene, New Hampshire
Keene State College alumni
Democratic Party members of the New Hampshire House of Representatives
21st-century American politicians
Year of birth missing (living people)